Jason King may refer to:
 Jason King (American football) (born 1993), offensive lineman for the New England Patriots
 Jason King (ice hockey) (born 1981), ice hockey player
 Jason King (radio) (born 1975), British radio DJ
 Jason King (rugby league) (born 1981), Manly Sea Eagles rugby league player
 Jason King (speedway rider) (born 1985), English speedway rider

in fiction:
 Jason King (TV series), British television programme
 Jason King (character), fictional character in Jason King and Department S